Ceryx riouensis is a moth of the subfamily Arctiinae. It was described by Obraztsov in 1957. It is found on Durian Island in the Riou Archipelago.

References

Ceryx (moth)
Moths described in 1957